Acrobasis tumidana is a moth of the family Pyralidae. It was described in 1775 by Michael Denis and Ignaz Schiffermüller and is found in Europe.

The wingspan is 19–24 mm. The moth flies in one generation from July to August..

The larvae feed on oak.

Notes
The flight season refers to Belgium and the Netherlands. This may vary in other parts of the range.

References

External links
 
 Lepidoptera of Belgium
 UK Moths
 waarneming.nl 

Acrobasis
Moths described in 1775
Moths of Europe
Taxa named by Michael Denis
Taxa named by Ignaz Schiffermüller